The 1915 Detroit Tigers football team  was an American football team that represented the University of Detroit in the 1915 college football season. In its first season under head coach Harry Costello, the team compiled a 1–5 record and was outscored by its opponents by a combined total of 207 to 18.

In its schedule for the 1915 University of Detroit football team, College Football Data Warehouse erroneously included an undated game against Hutchinson Central High School from Buffalo, New York.  However, the Detroit Free Press for October 17, 1915, at page 23, shows that the game against Hutchinson was played on October 16 at Elmwood Field by the "Detroit University School", a high school team in Detroit, not by the University of Detroit.  In fact, the University of Detroit team played a game against Olivet College at Mack Park on the same afternoon.

Schedule

References

Detroit
Detroit Titans football seasons
Detroit Tigers football
Detroit Tigers football